Steeve Elana (born 11 July 1980) is a professional footballer who plays as a goalkeeper for FC Martigues and the Martinique national football team.

He previously played for Lille OSC in the French Ligue 1. He became first choice goalkeeper for Lille after the departure of Mickaël Landreau. However, he was displaced in 2013–14 by the Nigerian international Vincent Enyeama.

International career
Born in France, Elana is of Martiniquais and Guinean descent. In March 2019, 38-year-old Elana was called up to the Guinea national team, having previously played internationally for Martinique which is a non-FIFA member. He was unable to get a Guinean passport, as he was not able to confirm the Guinean village his grandparents came from.

References

External links
 
 

1980 births
Living people
Association football goalkeepers
Sportspeople from Aubervilliers
Martiniquais footballers
Martinique international footballers
2014 Caribbean Cup players
French footballers
French people of Martiniquais descent
French sportspeople of Guinean descent
Martiniquais people of Guinean descent
Sportspeople of Guinean descent
ASOA Valence players
Stade Malherbe Caen players
Stade Brestois 29 players
US Marseille Endoume players
Lille OSC players
Gazélec Ajaccio players
Tours FC players
SO Cholet players
Ligue 1 players
Ligue 2 players
Championnat National players
Championnat National 2 players
Footballers from Seine-Saint-Denis
Black French sportspeople